Birdy or Birdie may refer to:

Places in the United States 

 Birdie, Georgia, an unincorporated community
 Birdie, Mississippi, an unincorporated community

People with the name 

 Birdie Blye (1871–1935), American pianist
 Birdy (singer) (born 1996), the stage name of English singer-songwriter Jasmine van den Bogaerde
 Birdy, pseudonym of a former guitarist of the glam punk band Trashcan Darlings
 Henry Robertson Bowers (1883–1912), nicknamed "Birdie",  participant in Robert Falcon Scott's doomed race to the South Pole
 Byrd Spilman Dewey (1856–1942), nicknamed "Birdie", American author and land investor
 Birdy Sweeney (1931–1999), Irish actor and comedian
 Birdie Tebbetts (1912–1999), American baseball player and manager
 Jack Ward ( 1553–1622), nicknamed "Birdy", notorious English pirate and Barbary Corsair

Arts and entertainment

Fictional characters 

 Birdie (Street Fighter), in Capcom's video games
 Betty Draper, on Mad Men, whom Don Draper affectionately refers to as "Birdie"
 Birdie the Early Bird, the first identifiably female McDonaldland character
 Birdy (comics), a Marvel Comics villain
 Birdy, in the Conker platform video game series
 Birdy, also known as Torii, a robotic pet in Gundam SEED and Gundam SEED Destiny
 Birdy, the title character of Birdy the Mighty, a Japanese manga series
 Wang Po-Te in Your Name Engraved Herein goes by the name Birdy, named after the character in the movie of the same name

Music 

 Birdy (Birdy album) (2011)
 Birdy (Peter Gabriel album), 1985 soundtrack of the film Birdy
 Birdy, an album by Bloodthirsty Butchers
 "Birdie", a song by Avril Lavigne from the album Head Above Water
 "Birdy", a song by British Sea Power from the single "Remember Me"

Other 
 Birdie (novel), by Tracey Lindberg
 Birdy (novel), by William Wharton
 Birdie (film), starring Maeve Dermody and Sam Parsonson, and directed by Shelly Lauman
 Birdy (film), starring Matthew Modine and Nicolas Cage, and directed by Alan Parker, based on Wharton's novel
 Birdie (given name)

Brands and enterprises 

 Birdy (bicycle), a folding bicycle
 Birdy Airlines (2002–2004), an airline based in Belgium

Sports 

 Birdie (golf), a score of one under par on a hole in golf
 A gun dog that gets excited by birds
 Shuttlecock, in badminton

Other uses 

 Birdie, the common nickname for a small parabolic aluminized reflector light
 Birdy, unwanted artifacts that occur in noise reduction or in "frequency mixing".
 BIRDIE, Martin AN/GSG-5 Battery Integration and Radar Display Equipment

See also 

 Byrdie Green (1936–2008), American jazz and R&B singer

Nicknames
Lists of people by nickname
fr:Vocabulaire du golf#B